Ivan Duke (21 November 1913 – 24 December 1991) was a South African boxer. He competed in the men's flyweight event at the 1932 Summer Olympics.

References

External links
 

1913 births
1991 deaths
South African male boxers
Olympic boxers of South Africa
Boxers at the 1932 Summer Olympics
People from Bethal
Flyweight boxers
Sportspeople from Mpumalanga